The Parrenin Quartet is a French chamber music ensemble for two violons, viola and cello.

History 
Created in 1944, it was the resident quartet of radio Luxembourg until 1949. Its extensive repertoire extends from quartets by Haydn to quartets by Schönberg and Bartók. It has been a member of the Domaine musical and the International Music Ensemble of Darmstadt. It has premiered more than 150 works by contemporary authors (Ligeti, Maderna, Boulez, Berio, Britten, Hans Werner Henze, Ohana, Xenakis).

Members 
 Jacques Parrenin, first violin
 Marcel Charpentier (1944-1970), Jacques Ghestem (1970-1980), John Cohen (1980-) second violin
 Serge Collot (1944-1957), Michel Walès (1957-1964), Denes Marton (1964-1970), Jean-Claude Dewaele (1970-1980), Gérard Caussé (1980-) viola
 Pierre Penassou (1944-1980), René Benedetti (1980-) cello

Selected discography 
 Ravel's String Quartet in F major EMI 1969
 Debussy's String Quartet in G minor op.10 EMI 1976

References

Source 
 Alain Pâris Dictionnaire des interprètes, series Bouquins, Éditions Robert Laffont 1989,

External links 
 Six quatuors à cordes / Bela Bartók, comp. Quatuor Parrenin on Gallica 
 Discography on Discogs
 Pierre Boulez, Livre pour quatuor, Parts I a and I b, Quatuor Parrenin (YouTube)

Parrenin
Musical groups established in 1944